Because it was positioned near the busy shipping lanes of the mid-19th century, a lighthouse was built on Granite Island in 1868 by the U.S. Lighthouse Board and commissioned in 1869.

The lighthouse keeper's dwelling and the square tower attached to it are built of cut stone with white limestone decorations on the corners and windows. The 1-story dwelling shares its design with lighthouses found on Gull Rock and Huron Islands Lighthouse as well as the Marquette Harbor Light. There is an existing Fog Signal Building, which was constructed in 1910 to replace the one originally built in 1879.  It is made of structural steel and is a bell tower.  The fog bell was the one from the light at Thunder Bay Island Light, and was removed. in 1939.

Lighthouse keepers and assistant keepers operated Granite Island Light until 1937 when the facility was automated and the living quarters were abandoned. Aids to navigation consisted of a 4th order Fresnel lens and a fog bell tower. At one time it had a red flash every 90 seconds.

Private ownership 
Modern navigation moved shipping lanes away from the island and the light, and farther out into Lake Superior.  This tended to make the Coast Guard view it as "surplus," and it was put up for private sale.  The sale in fact helped precipitate a later reaction by the U.S. Congress, which enacted a preference for selling such facilities to communities and charitable organizations under the National Historic Lighthouse Preservation Act of 2000, which was sponsored by Michigan Senator Carl Levin and passed in 2000.  Nevertheless, privatization advocates such as the Mackinac Center for Public Policy have praised the island's sale and its results.

Granite Island and the lighthouse were purchased by Scott and Martine Holman in 1999 from the U.S. Coast Guard. The facilities underwent a three-year restoration process. The house was completely gutted and rebuilt, with waste being boated out and materials bought in.  This is a challenging place to reach and live upon – they have to transport all of their water in, for example; composting toilets must be used, so not many visitors are welcomed. The web site, www.graniteisland.com, has live camera feeds, history, videos of the restoration process and photographs and discussion of its ecology and geology. The lighthouse was listed on the National Register of Historic Places in 1983.

Current status 
Despite its remoteness, and because of its picturesque location, form and color it is often the subject of photographs, and drawings.

The Island's infrastructure is host to an Internet relay station operated by Northern Michigan University to provide live real-time classes to the rural area of Big Bay and its school system.

The Holman's have donated a sophisticated weather research station to study the evaporative effects on the rise and fall of the water levels in the great Lakes.  This station is operated by Northern Michigan University and the data is made available to the National Weather Service to aid in Near Shore Forecasting.

The living quarters of the light station is made available to the NMU English Department for  creative writing retreats.

Transportation to and from the Island is provided by two "rib" Zodiacs 24' and 30' which can navigate the often rough water 12 miles south to the Marquette Lower harbor.

Power on the island is remote controlled year round and consists of solar panels, wind generators with back up propane generators.

Its characteristic is a white flash every 6 seconds.

Granite Island Light is one of more than 150 past and present lighthouses in Michigan.  Michigan has more lighthouses than any other state.  See Lighthouses in the United States.

Best views of this light are from the water.  The privately owned island and light are closed to the public.

See also
 Lighthouses in the United States

Notes

Further reading
LaFave, Michael (Jan. 16, 2002) Privatization Shines (article on the general subject of privatization of lighthouses.  Michigan Privatization Report, SKU: MPR2002-01  Mackinac Center for Public Policy.
Lighthouse Memories (December, 1999)  Lighthouse Digest.
Nelson, Donald L. (July, 1998) One of Superiors Little Known Lights.  Lighthouse Digest

External links
 Granite Island home page (including webcams and virtual tour).
 Interactive map on Michigan lighthouses, with excellent photographs by Scott Holman, Detroit News.
 Interactive map of lighthouses in area ("Central" Lake Superior).
 Terry Pepper, Seeing the Light, Granite Island Light.
 Marquette country on Granite Island light.
 Wobser, David, "Granite Island Light," at Boatnerd.com.
 Fog Bell tower photograph, bell removed 1939 when light automated.

Lighthouses completed in 1868
Houses completed in 1868
Lighthouses on the National Register of Historic Places in Michigan
National Register of Historic Places in Marquette County, Michigan